Superbad is a 2007 American coming-of-age teen buddy comedy film directed by Greg Mottola and produced by Judd Apatow. The film stars Jonah Hill and Michael Cera as Seth and Evan, two teenagers about to graduate from high school. Before graduating, the boys want to party and lose their virginity, but their plan proves harder than expected. Written by Seth Rogen and Evan Goldberg, the script began development when they were 13 years old, and was loosely based on their experience in Grade 12 at Point Grey Secondary School in Vancouver during the 1990s. The main characters have the same given names as the two writers. Rogen was also initially intended to play Seth, but due to age and physical size this was changed, and Hill went on to portray Seth, while Rogen portrayed the irresponsible Officer Michaels, opposite Saturday Night Live star Bill Hader as Officer Slater.

Superbad premiered at Grauman's Chinese Theatre on August 13, 2007. Upon release, the film received positive reviews, with critics praising the dialogue and the chemistry between the two leads as well as the performances of the supporting cast. The film also proved financially successful, grossing over $170 million on a $17.5–20 million budget. Since the film's release, it has garnered acclaim as one of the best comedies of the 2000s and as one of the best high school movies of all time. It has been hailed as one of the defining movies of the Millennial generation.

Plot
Seth and Evan are high school seniors who have been best friends since childhood. They are about to go off to different colleges. When Seth is paired with Jules during home economics class, she invites him to a party at her house that night. Their friend Fogell reveals his plans to obtain a fake ID, so Seth promises to buy alcohol for the party with money she gives him. Evan runs into his love interest Becca and he offers to get her a specific bottle of vodka for the party.

Despite Fogell's fake ID having only one name, "McLovin", he successfully buys the liquor, but is knocked out at the last second by a robber. When police officers Slater and Michaels arrive, Seth and Evan believe that Fogell is being arrested. In reality, the officers have agreed to give him a ride to the party.

Outside, Seth is hit by a car. In exchange for Seth and Evan not telling the police, the driver, Francis, promises to take them to another party where they can get alcohol. Meanwhile, Slater and Michaels take Fogell on a ride-along and then bond with him. Despite being on duty, they start drinking, use their sirens improperly, and shoot at a stop sign.

At the party, Seth fills laundry detergent bottles from the basement with alcohol he finds in the fridge and dances with drunk Jacinda. She stains his leg with menstrual blood, while some men high on cocaine make Evan sing "These Eyes" for them. About to leave, Seth is confronted by the host for dancing with his fiancée. A brawl ensues, Jacinda calls the police, while Seth and Evan escape.

Evan and Seth are arguing about Evan going to a different college from Seth, before the latter is again hit by a car – the police cruiser driven by Slater and Michaels. They plan to pin the blame of the crash on Seth himself and arrest them, but when Fogell comes out of the car, Evan makes a run for it, while Seth and Fogell escape with the alcohol. Eventually all three make their way to Jules' party.

Arriving at the party, Fogell inadvertently reveals that he and Evan will be rooming together at college, further adding to Seth's discontent towards Evan. Seth's stories of the night make him popular. Becca wants to have sex with Evan, but he respects her too much to go through with it while she is drunk.

Meanwhile, Fogell impresses Nicola, a student in school he was attracted to, and goes upstairs to have sex with her. Seth drunkenly attempts to kiss Jules, but she turns him down because she neither drinks nor wants Seth while he is drunk. He believes he has ruined any chance of anything with her and passes out, accidentally headbutting her and giving her a black eye.

Slater and Michaels bust the party. Seth wakes up and escapes, carrying an intoxicated Evan. Slater interrupts Fogell and Nicola as they are having sex, causing her to run off. Officer Slater is angry at Fogell for ditching them, but Michaels points out they have just interrupted him, and they apologize, reconcile, and reveal they knew all along that Fogell was not 25 as the ID said; They played along, wanting to show cops can have fun too.

To make it up to him, they pretend to arrest Fogell outside to make him look "badass." They resume their bonding, eventually destroying their car with a Molotov cocktail while Fogell shoots it with Slater's gun.

Seth and Evan return to Evan's, where Seth reveals to Evan that due to seeing housing forms at his house three weeks earlier, he learned that Evan and Fogell were rooming together the whole time. Evan admits he does not want to room with Fogell at college next year but is afraid to live with strangers. They apologize to each other before reconciling. The next day, they go to the mall where they run into Jules and Becca. Becca and Seth both apologize for their drunken behavior the previous night, and the boys pair off with the girls. Seth takes Jules to buy concealer for her black eye, while Evan and Becca leave to buy comforters, one to replace the one she ruined by vomiting on it.

Cast

 Jonah Hill as Seth
 Casey Margolis as Young Seth
 Michael Cera as Evan
 Christopher Mintz-Plasse as Fogell / McLovin
 Bill Hader as Officer Slater
 Seth Rogen as Officer Michaels
 Emma Stone as Jules
 Martha MacIsaac as Becca
 Laura Marano as Young Becca
 Aviva Baumann as Nicola
 Joe Lo Truglio as Francis
 Kevin Corrigan as Mark
 Dave Franco as Greg
 Laura Seay as Shirley
 Marcella Lentz-Pope as Gaby
 Stacy Edwards as Jane
 David Krumholtz as Benji Austin
 Martin Starr as James Masslin
 Ben Best as Quince Danbury
 Lauren Miller as Scarlett Brighton
 Steve Bannos as Math Teacher 
 Carla Gallo as a Period Blood Girl (Jacinda)
 Clark Duke as a Party Teenager	
 Danny McBride as Buddy at Party (uncredited)
 Cortney Palm as Party Guest (uncredited)
 Clement Blake as Homeless Guy
 Erica Vittina Phillips as Mindy

Production

Development
Superbad was written by Goldberg and Rogen during their teen years. It is loosely based on their own experience as seniors in Vancouver in the late 1990s, hence the character names Seth and Evan. Other characters and references were influenced by Goldberg and Rogen's adolescence, such as Steven Glanzberg, their peer at Point Grey Secondary School, characterized in the film as a loner. According to an interview at an event panel in 2009, Fogell was also a real friend of Rogen and Goldberg. Rogen was initially slated to play Hill's character Seth, but due to his physical size and age, he played one of the police officers. When asked where he wants to be dropped off, Fogell tells the officers to take him to 13th and Granville, a nod to Rogen and Goldberg's favorite all-you-can-eat sushi restaurant in Vancouver. Superbad took seven years to complete from early scripting in 2000 and filming from 2006 to 2007. Among the films that served as inspiration for Superbad were Dazed and Confused, Fast Times at Ridgemont High, and American Graffiti.

Filming
The film was primarily shot in Los Angeles in 2006. Exterior shots of the high school were filmed at El Segundo High School. The mall scenes were shot at the Fox Hills Mall in Culver City, California.

Other filming locations include the convenience store at the beginning of the film, also in Culver City, the liquor store where "McLovin" gets IDed in Glendale, California, and the bar where the cops take McLovin for a drink is neighboring Los Angeles International Airport (LAX). The scene where McLovin and the cops do donuts in the cop car was filmed in a parking lot on the California State University, Northridge campus.

Mintz-Plasse was 17 at the time of filming Superbad, and as a result, his mother was required to be present on set during the filming of his sex scene.

Reception

Box office
Superbad opened at number one at the United States box office, grossing US$33,052,411 in its opening weekend from 2,948 theaters for an average of US$11,212 per theater. The film stayed at  the second week, grossing US$18,044,369.

The film grossed US$121.5 million in the United States and Canada and US$48.4 million in other countries, for a total of US$169.9 million worldwide. Compared to the budget of $17.5–20 million, the film earned a huge financial profit, making it the highest domestic grossing high school comedy at the time (it was surpassed by 21 Jump Street, a film also starring Hill, in 2012).

Critical response
On Rotten Tomatoes the film has an approval rating of 87% based on reviews from 207 critics, with an average rating of 7.40/10. The website's consensus reads, "Deftly balancing vulgarity and sincerity while placing its protagonists in excessive situations, Superbad is an authentic take on friendship and the overarching awkwardness of the high school experience." On Metacritic, the film has a score of 76/100 based on 36 reviews, indicating "generally favorable reviews." Audiences surveyed by CinemaScore gave the film a grade A− on scale of A to F.

Mick LaSalle of the San Francisco Chronicle called it 2007's most successful comedy. Roger Ebert of the Chicago Sun-Times had the headline of his review read "McLovin It," and gave the film 3 out of 4 stars, and said "The movie reminded me a little of National Lampoon's Animal House, except that it's more mature, as all movies are." Carina Chocano of the Los Angeles Times said "Physically, Hill and Cera recall the classic comic duos—Laurel and Hardy, Abbott and Costello, Aykroyd and Belushi. But they are contemporary kids, sophisticated and sensitive to nuance"; she added, "I hope it's not damning the movie with the wrong kind of praise to say that for a film so deliriously smutty, Superbad is supercute." Sean Burns of Philadelphia Weekly said "2007: the year Judd Apatow and Seth Rogen saved movie comedy", a reference to Knocked Up which was released in June. Devin Gordon of Newsweek said "As a Revenge of the Nerds redux, Superbad isn't perfect. But it's super close."

In a more critical vein, Stephen Farber of The Hollywood Reporter, compared the film to other films with a single-day structure, such as American Graffiti and Dazed and Confused, but said that Superbad "doesn't have the smarts or the depths of those ensemble comedies." The Hollywood Reporter review was referenced in the film's DVD audio commentary, particularly the review's suggestion that the two main characters have a homoerotic experience similar to the film Y Tu Mamá También. Roger Moore of the Orlando Sentinel called the film a "super-derivative, super-raunchy sack of laughs" and a "great vulgarian send-off to the summer of Knocked Up" that plays like "Freaks and Geeks: Uncensored." Moore concluded, "The energy flags as it overstays its welcome. The Apatow Rule, 'If it gets a laugh, don't cut it,' doesn't do movies under his banner any favors. Still, there are plenty of those laughs, from the ruder-than-rude opening to the ironic-sentimental ending." Wesley Morris of The Boston Globe said the film "has a degree more sophistication than Revenge of the Nerds and American Pie, and less than the underrated House Party." Morris also said, "the few smart observations could have come from an episode of one of Apatow's TV shows" and "I wanted to find this as funny as audiences did."

Accolades

Won
 Canadian Comedy Awards 2008 – Seth Rogen – Best Writing. Rogen could not attend the awards ceremony but recorded a special thank you message.
 Canadian Comedy Awards 2008 – Michael Cera – Best Male Performance
 Chicago Film Critics Association Awards 2007 – Michael Cera – Most Promising Performer
 Austin Film Critics Association Awards 2007 – Michael Cera – Breakthrough Artist Award
 Young Hollywood Awards 2008 – Emma Stone – Exciting New Face

Nominated
 2008 MTV Movie Awards – Best Movie
 2008 MTV Movie Awards – Michael Cera, Jonah Hill, Christopher Mintz-Plasse – Breakthrough
 2008 Peabody Award – Best New Comedy Performance
 2008 MTV Movie Awards – Jonah Hill – Best Comedic Performance
 Broadcast Film Critics Association Awards 2007 – Best Comedy Movie
 Broadcast Film Critics Association Awards 2007 – Michael Cera – Best Young Actor
 Empire Awards 2007 – Best Comedy
 Teen Choice Awards 2007 – Choice Summer Movie – Comedy/Musical

Home media
Superbad was released via DVD, UMD and Blu-ray on December 4, 2007, in two versions: theatrical (113 minutes) and unrated (118 minutes). Special features include deleted scenes, an audio commentary with cast and crew, line-o-ramas (a feature most associated with Apatow films), a making-of, and a number of short featurettes.

Books
Two tie-in books to the film were published by Newmarket Press:
 Superbad: The Illustrated Moviebook was published on December 4, 2007, to coincide with the release of the film on DVD. This official companion book includes an introduction by producer Judd Apatow; the complete script by Seth Rogen and Evan Goldberg; commentaries by Apatow, Rogen and Goldberg, and journalists from Rolling Stone, The New York Times, and Entertainment Weekly; 56 film stills; "Mr. Vagtastic Guide to Buying Porn;" and 24 "phallographic" drawings by David Goldberg that viewers will recognize from the film's end credits.
 Superbad: The Drawings was published on February 14, 2008. This gift hardcover art book contains 82 "phallographic" drawings created by David Goldberg (Evan Goldberg's brother) for the film.

Soundtrack

References

External links

  – Sony Pictures Movies
 
 
 
 

2000s buddy comedy films
2000s coming-of-age comedy films
2000s high school films
2000s sex comedy films
2000s teen comedy films
2007 films
American buddy comedy films
American coming-of-age comedy films
American high school films
American sex comedy films
American teen comedy films
Teen buddy films
Apatow Productions films
Columbia Pictures films
2000s English-language films
Films about alcoholism
Films about parties
Films about virginity
Films directed by Greg Mottola
Films produced by Judd Apatow
Films shot in Los Angeles
Films with screenplays by Seth Rogen
2000s teen sex comedy films
2007 comedy films
Films with screenplays by Evan Goldberg
Films scored by Lyle Workman
2000s American films